The Yowamushi Pedal anime series premiered on October 7, 2013. Episodes are simulcast with English, Spanish, and Portuguese subs on Crunchyroll under the series name Yowapeda to people in the United States, Canada, the Caribbean, South Africa, and Central and South America. Season one covers how Onoda Sakamichi gets involved in the sport of bicycle racing and how he participates during his first year of high school in the Inter-High race. Season one lasts 38 episodes.

Music

Opening themes
 "Reclimb" by ROOKIEZ is PUNK'D (episodes 1–12)
 "Yowamushi na Honoo" by DIRTY OLD MEN (now known as MAGIC OF LiFE)  (eps. 13–25)
 "Be As One" by Team Sōhoku (eps. 26–38)
 "Determination" by LASTGASP (Grande Road eps. 1-12)
 "Remind" by ROOKIEZ is PUNK'D (Grande Road eps. 13-24)
 "Cadence" by Natsushiro Takaaki (New Generation, episodes 1-12)
 "Transit" by Natsushiro Takaaki (New Generation, episodes 13-24)
 "Boku no Koe" by Rhythmic Toy World (Glory Line, episodes 1-12)
 "Dancing" by Saeki YouthK (Glory Line, episodes 13-25)
Ending themes
 "Kaze wo Yokube" by Under Graph (eps. 1–12)
 "I'm Ready" by AUTRIBE feat. DIRTY OLD MEN (eps. 13–25)
 "Glory Road" by Team Hakone Gakuen (eps. 26–38)
 "Realize" by ROOKiEZ is PUNK'D (Grande Road eps. 1-12)
 "Eikou no Ichibyou" by MAGIC OF LiFE (Grande Road eps. 13-24)
 "Now Or Never" by Saeki Yuusuke (New Generation, episodes 1-12)
 "Takai Tokoro" by Saeki Yuusuke (New Generation, episodes 13-24)
 "Carry the Hope" by THE HIGH CADENCE (Glory Line, episodes 1-12)
 "Over the Limit" by ROUTE85 (Glory Line, episodes 13-25)

Yowamushi Pedal

Yowamushi Pedal Grande Road
A second season of the series began in October 2014. Season 2 picks up where Season 1 left off, concluding Day 2 and the rest of Day 3 of the 41st Summer Inter-High. Joining the Sohoku team is Machimiya Eikichi and the entire Hiroshima Kureminami Technical High School bicycle team. Their sole goal is to take down Hakone Academy. Season 2 lasts 24 episodes.

Yowamushi Pedal: New Generation
The 41st Summer Inter-High is over! All the third-year seniors are going their separate ways. Now it is time for the next generation of racers to fight next year's 42nd Summer Inter-High race.

Yowamushi Pedal: Glory Line

Yowamushi Pedal: Limit Break

References 

Yowamushi Pedal